Smoke 'Em If You Got 'Em is a 1988 Australian short feature. It is a cult movie.

Premise
Nuclear war reaches Elwood, Melbourne.

Cast
Nique Needles
Rob Howard
Fred Dugina
Danny Lillford
Clayton Jacobsen

Production
The film originated as a film school project at Swinburne from Ray Bosley. It was funded from a Film Victoria grant.

Release 
The film released in 1988. In May 2020 the film screened at Monster Fest in Australia.

Reception
Reviewing the DVD re-release The Curb wrote "When the rest of the world was making Threads, Miracle Mile and The Day After, Australia was busy making Smoke ‘Em If You’ve Got ‘Em. Writer/director Ray Boseley plugs in the amp, loads up the bong, and turns off the lights for the party to end all parties as he brings the nuclear apocalypse to the Elwood, Melbourne. This 1988 raucous punk affair runs for a brisk 48 minutes, making good on the promise that once the bombs hit, you don’t have long to live, so you best have one heck of a time while you’re going out. "

According to the Oz Movies website, the film "certainly more fun than watching other Australian post-apocalyptic movies, such as John Duigan's dull, well-meaning One Night Stand, or the wretched On the Beach, which shares Melbourne as a location, but in the Stanley Kramer way offers not a shred of nihilistic, anarchistic, Swinburnian Melburnian humour."

References

External links
Film page at Oz Movies
Film page at IMDb
Film listing at Monster pictures
Film page at Letterbox DVD

1988 films
Australian war drama films
1980s English-language films